Saipu  is a village development committee in Ramechhap District in the Janakpur Zone of north-eastern Nepal. At the time of the 1991 Nepal census it had a population of 2,876  people living in 616 individual households.

References

https://web.archive.org/web/20141026000000/http://cbs.gov.np/wp-content/uploads/2014/04/21Ramechhap_WardLevel.pdf

Populated places in Ramechhap District